Ion Emanuel Florescu (7 August 1819, Râmnicu Vâlcea, Wallachia – 10 May 1893, Paris, France) was a Romanian army general who served as Prime Minister of Romania for a short time in a provisional government in 1876 (4 April – 26 April) and then in 1891 (2 March – 29 December). He also served as Chief of the General Staff in 1860 (30 May – 30 August) and then from 21 April 1864 to 1 May 1866.

His cousin was Bonifaciu Florescu.

Chiefs of the General Staff of Romania
People from Râmnicu Vâlcea
Prime Ministers of Romania
Romanian Land Forces generals
Romanian Ministers of Defence
Romanian Ministers of Interior
Romanian Ministers of Agriculture
Romanian Ministers of Public Works
Members of the Chamber of Deputies (Romania)
Members of the Senate of Romania
Presidents of the Senate of Romania
1819 births
1893 deaths